Tomas Käyhkö is a Finnish ten-pin bowler.

In 2019, he won silver in pairs with Niko Oksanen at the European Championships. In his first World Championships in 2021, he won silver in singles. 

In 2020, he was chosen as the bowler of the year in Finland. At that time, his achievements included winning the Finnish Masters and the Finnish doubles championship. Käyhkö represents Varkaus Mainarei. At the opening competition of the 2023 PBA Tour season, the U.S. Open major, Tomas qualified as the #2 seed and finished third in the February 5 final round.

References

Living people
Finnish ten-pin bowling players
Year of birth missing (living people)
Place of birth missing (living people)